South Fork Tomlinson Run is a  long 2nd order tributary to Tomlinson Run in Hancock County, West Virginia.  This stream along with North Fork Tomlinson Run, forms Tomlinson Run in Tomlinson Run Lake.

Course
South Fork Tomlinson Run rises about 5 miles southwest of Hookstown, Pennsylvania, in Beaver County and then flows west into Hancock County, West Virginia to form Tomlinson Run at Tomlinson Run State Park.

Watershed
South Fork Tomlinson Run drains  of area, receives about 38.3 in/year of precipitation, has a wetness index of 334.56, and is about 59% forested.

See also
List of rivers of West Virginia

References

Rivers of Beaver County, Pennsylvania
Rivers of Hancock County, West Virginia
Rivers of Pennsylvania
Rivers of West Virginia